David Robert Brooks (born 8 July 1997) is a professional footballer who plays as a midfielder for  club AFC Bournemouth and the Wales national team. He played for both Wales and England at youth level before making his senior debut for Wales in 2017.

Club career

Early career
Brooks was born in Warrington, Cheshire. He was associated with the Manchester City academy from the age of seven, before he switched to the Sheffield United academy in 2014 and signed professional forms with the club in March 2015. He joined National League side Halifax Town on a one-month loan on 29 August 2015. Brooks had his loan extended into a second month and scored one goal, against Aldershot Town, in his five appearances.

Sheffield United
He made his first-team debut for the Blades on 30 August 2016, coming on as a 63rd-minute substitute for Matt Done in a 0–0 draw with Leicester City U23 in an EFL Trophy group stage match at Bramall Lane. He made his first start for the club in the next fixture in the competition, a 2–1 home defeat by Walsall on 4 October, following which manager Chris Wilder said that "I think it's difficult for a young player to impress when the players around him aren't performing". Four days later, he was picked for the Wales team by Chris Coleman.

Brooks scored his first senior goal on 27 October 2017, scoring only six minutes after coming on as a substitute against Leeds United to seal the Blades''' 2–1 victory in a Yorkshire derby.

In October 2017, he signed a new long-term contract, committing his future to Bramall Lane until the summer of 2021.

AFC Bournemouth
2018–19 season
In July 2018, Brooks joined AFC Bournemouth of the Premier League for a fee of £11.5 million. In doing so, he signed a four-year contract with the club and was assigned the number 20 jersey. Brooks made his Premier League debut in the first game of the 2018–19 season, starting in a 2–0 home win against Cardiff City. He scored his first goal for the club, and his first goal in the Premier League, in a 2–1 home win against Crystal Palace.

Following on from his goal against Palace on 1 October, Brooks scored in Premier League victories over Watford; a 0–4 away win and Fulham; a 0–3 away win, over the rest of the month. This impressive run of form saw him receive the club's Player of the Month award for October.

The run of good form continued for Brooks, scoring the first brace of his career in a 2–0 home win against Brighton & Hove Albion in the Premier League, on 22 December. Manager Eddie Howe commented after the game that he was "pleasantly surprised" by the start Brooks had made to his Bournemouth career, commending his attitude and tactical understanding of Bournemouth's style of play. His performances in December led to his second Player of the Month award, being named the club's Player of the Month for December. Brooks scored the second goal in his club's comprehensive 4–0 home victory over Chelsea, on 30 January, putting in an impressive showing against one of the league's traditional top-six teams.

In March 2019, he signed a new long-term contract with the club, with Howe commenting that: "This contract means he can concentrate on developing his game with us, and it's been an excellent start to David's AFC Bournemouth career."

After scoring again in the Cherries 5–0 away win over Brighton on 13 April, Brooks finished his maiden top-flight season with Bournemouth with seven goals across 33 total appearances. Due to his performances for the club throughout the 2018–19 season, he was nominated, for the PFA Young Player of the Year award, alongside names such as Manchester City duo Raheem Sterling and Bernardo Silva, and Manchester United's Marcus Rashford.

2019–20 season
In a pre-season friendly against Brentford, Brooks suffered an ankle injury which was reportedly set to leave him sidelined until mid-October. In December 2019, following a prolonged period on the sidelines, he underwent a second ankle operation, with the view of being sidelined until mid-March. Commenting on the injury, Brooks said in February that "[I] didn't know it was going to be six months and I don't think the physios would have thought that either".

On 11 March, he returned to training with the rest of the squad after nearly eight months out through injury. Having returned from injury, Brooks scored his first goal of the season, in a 2–1 loss to Man City, on 15 July. He finished the 2019–20 season with nine league appearances and one goal as the Cherries were relegated to the Championship after a five-year stay in the Premier League.

2020–21 season
After relegation from the Premier League, Brooks returned to the Cherries side as a sub in their 3–2 opening day win against Blackburn Rovers. Brooks scored his first goals of the season, a brace, in a 1–3 away win at Birmingham City. In November, Brooks was named Championship Player of the Month after scoring two goals and adding three assists in three matches.

2021–22 season
On 14 August, Brooks received the first red card of his senior career (after a double-yellow); in a 2–1 away win against Nottingham Forest in the Championship. He also scored the opener in the game.

International career
Brooks was eligible to play for his birth country, England and Wales – the latter through his mother, who hails from Llangollen.

On 15 May 2017, he was called up to the Wales U20 squad for the 2017 Toulon Tournament. He later withdrew from the Wales setup, instead being called up to the England U20 squad for the same tournament. England won the tournament and Brooks was given the Best Player award, having scored in the Final.

On 25 August 2017, he was then called up to the Wales U21 squad for the European Championship qualifiers against Switzerland and Portugal. Brooks made his debut for the side on 1 September 2017, in a 3–0 victory over Switzerland, scoring the second goal of the match.

On 28 September 2017, he was called up to the Wales senior squad, for two World Cup qualifiers against Georgia and Ireland. Brooks made his senior debut for Wales, on 10 November 2017, coming on as a substitute in a 2–0 defeat against France.

He scored his first goal for Wales; in a 2–1 away defeat to Croatia after coming on as a substitute.

Brooks was selected in May 2021 by Wales' caretaker manager Rob Page to represent the nation at the delayed UEFA Euro 2020 tournament.

Personal life
On 13 October 2021, Brooks was confirmed to have been diagnosed with Stage 2 Hodgkin lymphoma. Brooks had withdrawn from the Wales squad the week before due to illness. After being sent for a medical examination by the Wales medical staff, the diagnosis was made. After an initial positive prognosis, he was to undergo treatment from the following week.

On 3 May 2022, he announced on his social media that he had been given the all clear and was now cancer free.

Career statistics
Club

International
.

As of match played 26 June 2021. Wales' score listed first, score column indicates score after each Brooks goal.

HonoursAFC BournemouthEFL Championship runner-up: 2021–22Individual'''
Toulon Tournament Golden Ball: 2017
Toulon Tournament Best XI: 2017
Welsh Footballer of the Year: 2018

References

External links

Profile at the AFC Bournemouth website

1997 births
Living people
Footballers from Warrington
English footballers
Welsh footballers
Association football midfielders
Manchester City F.C. players
Sheffield United F.C. players
FC Halifax Town players
AFC Bournemouth players
National League (English football) players
English Football League players
Premier League players
England youth international footballers
Wales under-21 international footballers
Wales international footballers
UEFA Euro 2020 players
English people of Welsh descent